The 2012-13 Oman First Division League (known as the Omantel First Division League for sponsorship reasons) is the 37th edition of the second-highest division overall football league in Oman. The season began on 5 October 2012 and concluded on 10 May 2013. Saham were the defending champions, having won their first title in the previous 2011–12 season.

League table

Promotion/relegation play-off

1st Leg

2nd Leg

Sohar secured promotion after winning on the away goals rule

References

Oman First Division League seasons
Oman
2012–13 in Omani football